Michael Kieran Reilly (July 15, 1869 – October 14, 1944), was a U.S. representative from Wisconsin.

Reilly was born in the town of Empire, Wisconsin in Fond du Lac County, Wisconsin on July 15, 1869.  He graduated from what is today, the University of Wisconsin–Oshkosh in 1889 and earned his law degree from the University of Wisconsin–Madison in 1894. He served as Fond du Lac County district attorney for two years (1899–1900) and city attorney of Fond du Lac from 1905 to 1910.  Between stints in the United States Congress, he continued to practice law in Wisconsin.

In 1912, Reilly was elected a member of the Democratic Party to the Sixty-third United States Congress as the representative of Wisconsin's 6th congressional district. He was reelected to the Sixty-fourth Congress but lost his re-election bid to Republican James H. Davidson to the Sixty-fifth Congress. To fill the vacancy caused by the death of Florian Lampert, Reilly was once again elected to the Seventy-first Congress.  Once again representing Wisconsin's sixth district. He served another four terms until he lost a re-election bid to Republican, Frank Bateman Keefe, in 1938.  Reilly died in Neptune, New Jersey, on October 14, 1944 and is interred at Woodlawn Cemetery in the Bronx, New York.

External links

 

1869 births
1944 deaths
University of Wisconsin Law School alumni
Democratic Party members of the United States House of Representatives from Wisconsin
People from Empire, Wisconsin